The 1973 Louisville Cardinals football team was an American football team that represented the University of Louisville in the Missouri Valley Conference (MVC) during the 1973 NCAA Division I football season. In their first season under head coach T. W. Alley, the Cardinals compiled a 5–6 record (3–2 against conference opponents) and outscored opponents by a total of 172 to 148.

The team's statistical leaders included Len DePaola with 808 passing yards, Walter Peacock with 1,294 rushing yards and 60 points scored, and Dale Kaminski with 262 receiving yards.

Schedule

References

Louisville
Louisville Cardinals football seasons
Louisville Cardinals football